Zorynsk (is a city in Perevalsk Raion in Luhansk Oblast (region) of Ukraine. Population: , .

History 
Zorynsk is a city since 1963.

From 2014-2022, Zorynsk has been controlled by forces of the Luhansk People's Republic.

References

Cities in Luhansk Oblast
Yekaterinoslav Governorate
Populated places established in the Russian Empire
Cities of district significance in Ukraine